Panoche Creek is a creek in San Benito and Fresno Counties, California, in the United States.

Historical names include Arroyo de Panoche Grande (Big Sugarloaf Creek) and the anglicized Big Panoche Creek. For a time its lower reaches were called "Silver Creek."

The source of Panoche Creek is a pond just east of Panoche Pass in the Diablo Range. It flows to the east through the Panoche Valley into the San Joaquin Valley west of Mendota near the former site of Hayes Station.

Panoche Creek has the largest drainage area of any stream on the east slope of the Diablo Range.

History 
Arroyo de Panoche Grande was part of a route between the Indian settlements of the central coast of California and the San Joaquin Valley. It was also a watering place on El Camino Viejo between Arroyita de Panoche (Little Sugarloaf Creek) and Arroyo de Cantua (Cantua Creek).

Spanish soldiers followed Panoche Creek on expeditions to explore the region. It was an area of frequent conflict with local native peoples, who raided mission properties and were subject to conversion during the period of Indian Reductions. Vaqueros and musteneros followed the creek into the San Joaquin Valley to round up cattle and horses, respectively.

Both Panoche Creek and Panoche Valley, are referred to as the "Big Panoche", distinguishing them from the Little Panoche Creek, and valley.

References

Rivers of Fresno County, California
Rivers of San Benito County, California
Tributaries of the San Joaquin River
Diablo Range
Geography of the San Joaquin Valley
El Camino Viejo
Rivers of Northern California